Malinovo is a rural locality (a village) in Karinskoye Rural Settlement, Alexandrovsky District, Vladimir Oblast, Russia. The population was 6 as of 2010. There is 1 street.

Geography 
Malinovo is located on the bank of the Molokcha River, 20 km south of Alexandrov (the district's administrative centre) by road. Afonasovo is the nearest rural locality.

References 

Rural localities in Alexandrovsky District, Vladimir Oblast